Triathlon at the 2015 Island Games was held on 28 June at Les Jardins de la Mer, Jersey.

Medal Table

Results

References 

2015 Island Games
Island